Sardanapalus is a 1698 opera by Christian Ludwig Boxberg.

Recording
Sardanapalus Jan Kobow, Rinnat Moriah, Franz Vitzthum, Sören Richter, United Continuo Ensemble, Bernhard Epstein

References

1698 operas